Rajya Sabha elections were held on various dates in 2006, to elect members of the Rajya Sabha, Indian Parliament's upper chamber. The elections were held to elect respectively one member from Sikkim, 58 members from 15 states, two members from Jharkhand, and three members from Kerala, for the Council of States, the Rajya Sabha.

Elections
Elections were held to elect members from various states.

Members elected
The following members are elected in the elections held in 2006.
The list is incomplete.

State - Member - Party

Bye-elections
The following bye elections were held in the year 2006.

State - Member - Party

 Bye-elections were held on 28/03/2006 for vacancy from Orissa due to the expulsion of seating member Dr Chhattrapal Singh Lodha on 23 December 2005 with term ending on 1 July 2010

 Bye-elections were held on 15/06/2006 for vacancy from Uttar Pradesh due to disqualification of seating member Jaya Bachchan on 16.03.2006 with term ending on -- and due to resignation of seating member Anil Ambani on 29.03.2006 with term ending on -- 

 Bye-elections were held on 15/06/2006 for vacancy from Maharashtra and Jammu and Kashmir due to death of seating member Pramod Mahajan on 03.05.2006 with term ending on -- and due to resignation of seating member Ghulam Nabi Azad  on 29.04.2006 with term ending on -- 

 Bye-elections were held on 13/07/2006 for vacancy from Tamil Nadu due to resignation of seating member R. Sarath Kumar on 31 May 2006, with term ending on 24 July 2007

 Bye-elections were held on 18/09/2006 for vacancy from Maharashtra due to death of seating member Vasant Chavan on 11 July 2006, with term ending on 2 April 2012

 Bye-elections were held on 11/12/2006 for vacancy from Uttar Pradesh due to death of seating member Lalit Suri on 10 October 2006, with term ending on 4 July 2010

References

2006 elections in India
2006